Susan Rankaitis (born 1949) is an American multimedia artist working primarily in painting, photography and drawing. Rankaitis began her career in the 1970s as an abstract painter. Visiting the Art Institute of Chicago while in graduate school, she had a transformative encounter with the photograms of the artist László Moholy-Nagy (1895–1946), whose abstract works of the 1920s and 1940s she saw as "both painting and photography." Rankaitis began to develop her own experimental methods for producing abstract and conceptual artworks related both to painting and photography.

Rankaitis draws on science in her work—particularly ideas generated through research in the fields of biology and neuroscience and she collaborates regularly with scientists on interdisciplinary projects.

Education 
 MFA, Painting and Photography, University of Southern California, School of Fine Arts (1977)
 BFA, Painting, University of Illinois, Champaign-Urbana, School of Art and Design (1971)

Solo exhibitions 
 2017: Light Play: Experiments in Photography, 1970 to the Present, Los Angeles County Museum of Art
 2017: Grey Matters, Robert Mann Gallery, New York, NY
 2007: Limbicwork, Robert Mann Gallery, New York, NY
 2005: Limbicwork: Pertaining to the Nature of Borders, Europos Parkas, Vilnius, Lithuania (outdoor)
 2000: Susan Rankaitis: Drawn from Science, Museum of Photographic Arts, San Diego, CA
 1998: Science as Art: Susan Rankaitis, Indiana University/Purdue University Cultural Arts Gallery, Indianapolis, IN
 1997: Gold Science Ghost Drawings, Robert Mann Gallery, New York, NY
 1994: Susan Rankaitis: Abstracting Science, Nature and Technology, Museum of Contemporary Photography, Chicago, IL
 1992: DNA Series: Susan Rankaitis, Ruth Bloom Gallery, Santa Monica, CA
 1991: Susan Rankaitis: Encounters, Center for Creative Photography, Tucson, AZ
 1983: Susan Rankaitis: Inherent in Flight, Los Angeles County Museum of Art
 1983: Susan Rankaitis: L'Avion, L'Avion, International Museum of Photography at the George Eastman House, Rochester, NY

Academic career 
Rankaitis has served since 1990 as Fletcher Jones Chair in Studio Art at Scripps College in Claremont, California.

Public collections 
 Art Institute of Chicago
 Museum of Contemporary Photography, Columbia College, Chicago, IL
 Los Angeles County Museum of Art
 Cantor Arts Center at Stanford University
 Princeton University Art Museum
 San Francisco Museum of Modern Art
 Smithsonian American Art Museum
 University of Maryland, Adele H. Stamp Student Union, Contemporary Art Purchasing Program
 Minneapolis Institute of Arts

References

External links
 Smithsonian American Art Museum
 Official website

American photographers
20th-century American painters
American women artists
1949 births
Living people
University of Southern California alumni
University of Illinois alumni
Scripps College faculty
21st-century American painters